The 2008 Tuvalu A-Division was the third season of association football competition. The league was won by Nauti FC for the second consecutive time and the third time overall. The league, containing 9 participating teams, which ran between February and October, was renamed, Premier League, having been called TNPF Soccer League the previous season.

References

Tuvalu A-Division seasons
Tuvalu
football